The Renault Clio Cup Series is a one-make racing series created and managed by Alpine Racing (until 2020 known as Renault Sport). The championship was born after merging the 4 active Renault Clio national cups at that moment plus the Clio Cup Europe.

National cups

Up to 22 different renault cups have come into existence at some point: Belgium, Brazil, China, Denmark, France, Germany, Hungary, Italy, Mexico, Spain, the Netherlands, Portugal, Switzerland, Turkey and United Kingdom for example.

French Cup
The French Clio Cup has been held since 2004.

The French Cup started in 1966 and used in succession Renault 8 Gordini (1966–1970), Renault 12 Gordini (1971–1974), Renault 5 LS kitée (1975–1976), Renault 5 Alpine (1977–1981), Renault 5 Alpine Turbo (1982–1984), Renault 5 GT Turbo (1985–1990), Renault Clio 16S (1991–1996) and Renault Mégane Coupé 16V (1997–2000). The French Cup wasn't held between 2001 and 2003.

Belgian Cup
This series started in 2001 as the Renault Sport Clio Cup Elf, but in 2005 the championship was cancelled due to the lack of participants. It returned in 2008 as the Renault Clio Cup Belux 2008 with 6 meetings.

The Renault Cup started in 1987 with the Renault 5 GT Turbo Cup organised jointly with the Netherlands. The Benelux championship switch into Belgian Cup with Renault Clio 16S between 1991 and 1996. Then it was Renault Mégane Coupé 16V (1997–2000) and finally the actual Clio cup (2001–2004, and since 2008).

United Kingdom Cup

The series' first winner of the inaugural race for Renault 5 TLs held in Brands Hatch was Maggie Loynd in 1974. The series, now known as the Courier Connections Renault UK Clio Cup, are now held as a support race to the British Touring Car Championship. The series previously supported the British leg of the World Series by Renault event.

The series saw subsequently these cars: Renault 5 TL (1974–1977), Renault 5 TS (1977–1985), Renault 5 GT Turbo (1985–1990), Renault Clio 16V Mark I (1991–1995), Renault Sport Spider (1996–1999), Clio Renaultsport 172 (2000–2001), Clio Renaultsport 182 (2002–2006), Clio Renaultsport 197 (2007–2009), and Clio Renaultsport 200 (2010–2019).

The series' past champion winners includes Andy Priaulx, Jason Plato and Tom Onslow-Cole. Other than that, past drivers of the series that were notable outside of racing were Andrew Ridgeley of the pop group Wham! in 1985 and it introduced actor Rowan Atkinson to motorsport, which he raced seldom between 1984 and 1990. One of his races was documented for his one-off show, Driven Man. The car has since re-emerged for a reunion race in 2004, which he aimed to compete in, but had to be substituted by Perry McCarthy, due to illness. Atkinson bought the car following the race and was auctioned off in a Bonhams auction in 2005.

Spanish Cup 
The Copa Nacional Renault is the longest running racing championship on speed circuits in Spain. The championship was released in 1969 taking advantage of the beginnings of the Jarama Circuit. It was organized for much of its history by FASA-Renault and Renault Sport Spain, while in its last decade it remained active thanks to Vline, Codony Sport and Driveland Events. Its last edition with its own national regulations was in 2020, denominating itself in its last 20 years of existence as Renault Sport Clio Cup Spain.

Other championships

 Renault Sport Clio International Cup
  Clio Cup China
 Renault Super Clio Cup Brazil
  Renault Sport Clio Cup Belgium
  Renault DTC Light Cup Denmark (since 2004 as Renault Clio Cup Denmark, since 2010 as Renault DTC Light Cup)
  LO Renault New Clio Cup Suisse
  Clio Cup Sweden
  Clio Cup Italia
  Dunlop Sportmaxx / ID&T Clio cup Netherlands
  Renault Sport Clio Cup Slovenia
  Michelin Clio Cup Series with Protyre
  Renault Clio Cup Junior Championship

Other one-make racing with Renault cars
 Renault Clio V6 Cup
 Dacia Logan Cup
 Alpine Elf Europa Cup
 IMSA Renault Cup (1982–1985 with Renault LeCar and then Renault Encore)
 SCCA Sports Renault Championship (1984–1989 with Renault/Jeep Sport USA open cockpit, purpose-built cars)
 Dacia Sandero RS Cup Portugal

The current car

Since 2020, the championship uses Renault Clio R.S. V with an Renault HR13 engine.

 Engine: Renault HR13, 4 cylinder, 1330 cm3 Turbo.
 Transmission: Sequentially controlled, dog-clutch box with 6 gears and controlled ZF differential.
 Suspension: Front: McPherson; Rear: H axis.
 Brakes: Discs, Front: ventilated ø280; Rear: solid ø238
 Wheels: Single piece 7 x 17  alloy
 Tyres: Michelin S9M (dry) or P2H (rain)
 Dimensions: Wheelbase: 2579 mm; Length/Width: 4050 mm/1988 mm
 Fuel tank: FIA FT3
 Weight: 1030 kg

Current regulations
Scoring system

Chronology and cars used
 Renault Promotional Cups

 Other series

Champions

See also
 Eurocup Mégane Trophy
 Dacia Logan Cup
 Formula Renault

References

External links
 Clio Cup Europe official website
   Clio Cup France official website
   Clio Cup Spain official website
   Clio Cup Italia official website
   Clio Cup Central Europe official website
   Clio Cup China official website

External links
DriverDB

 
One-make series
Touring car racing series